Tomáš Číp (born 5 October 1989) is a Czech handball player for Minaur Baia Mare and the Czech national team.

He participated at the 2018 European Men's Handball Championship.

References

External links

1989 births
Living people
People from Zubří
Czech male handball players
Expatriate handball players
Czech expatriate sportspeople in Slovakia
Czech expatriate sportspeople in Romania
Sportspeople from the Zlín Region